Jaroszów  is a village in the administrative district of Gmina Strzegom, within Świdnica County, Lower Silesian Voivodeship, in south-western Poland. Prior to 1945, it was in Germany.

The village has a population of 2,150.

References

Villages in Świdnica County